Carheil may refer to:

 Étienne de Carheil (1633–1726), French Jesuit priest who became a missionary to the Iroquois and Huron Indians in the New World
 Carheil Lake, lake in the Côte-Nord region of Quebec, Canada
 Carheil River, river in the Côte-Nord region of Quebec, Canada